The Goa cricket team is first-class cricket team based in Goa, India, has competed in the Ranji Trophy since the 1985–86 season.

Playing history
Goa lost all five matches in their first season, and did not win until 1996–97, in their 56th match, when they defeated Karnataka by an innings.

Venues 
Goa's home grounds are the Dr. Rajendra Prasad Stadium, Margao, and the Goa Cricket Association Academy Ground, Porvorim.

International venues

Domestic venues

Current squad 

Updated as on 24 January 2023

Coaching staff 
 Head Coach – Prakash Mayekar
 Under-19s Coach – Vinod Dhamasker
 Ranji Physio – Danny Pereira
 Ranji Trainers – Prabhakar Bairgond

References

External links
Cricinfo's Complete History of the Indian Domestic Competitions
Goa at CricketArchive
Goa Cricket Association website

Indian first-class cricket teams
Cricket in Goa
1985 establishments in Goa, Daman and Diu
Cricket clubs established in 1985